Allenby Street ( Rekhov Allenby) is a major street in Tel Aviv, Israel. It was named in honor of Field Marshal Viscount Allenby.

Allenby Street stretches from the Mediterranean Sea in the northwest to HaAliya Street in the southeast. It was first paved with concrete in 1914. During the day, it is a commercial street with many small businesses and clothing stores. At night, its cafés, pubs and restaurants throng with people. Many public buses run along Allenby Street.

Landmarks

Lederberg House
The 1925 Lederberg House, at the intersection of Rothschild Boulevard and Allenby, features a series of large ceramic murals designed by Ze'ev Raban of the Bezalel school. The four murals show a Jewish pioneer sowing and harvesting, a shepherd, and Jerusalem with a verse from Jeremiah 31:4, "Again I will rebuild thee and thou shalt be rebuilt."

References

Streets in Tel Aviv